The Shadow Chancellor of the Exchequer in the British Parliamentary system is the member of the Shadow Cabinet who is responsible for shadowing the Chancellor of the Exchequer. The title is given at the gift of the Leader of the Opposition and has no formal constitutional role, but is generally considered the second-most senior position on the opposition frontbench, after the Leader. Past Shadow Chancellors include Harold Wilson, James Callaghan, Edward Heath, Geoffrey Howe, Ken Clarke, Gordon Brown, and John McDonnell.

The current Shadow Chancellor is Rachel Reeves, who has held the position since 9 May 2021. She is the second woman to hold the position.

The name for the position has a mixed history. It is used to designate the lead economic spokesman for the Opposition. The name 'Shadow Chancellor' has also been used for the corresponding position for the Liberal Democrats, the Liberal Democrat Treasury spokesperson. This was a source of humour for Chancellor Gordon Brown, who in 2005 played the two off against one another in Parliament, saying, "I, too, have a great deal of time for the shadow Chancellor who resides in Twickenham [Liberal Democrat Vince Cable], rather than the shadow Chancellor for the Conservative Party."

List of Shadow Chancellors

References

Book 
Lewis Baston (2004) Reggie: The Life of Reginald Maudling. Sutton Publishing. 

Official Opposition (United Kingdom)
Shadow Chancellors of the Exchequer